Sarmiento is a  department located in the south west of San Juan Province in Argentina.

Geography 

Sarmiento is located in the center south of the San Juan Province, bordering the province of Mendoza, 59 kilometers from the city of San Juan, has an area of 2,782 km ² 

Its boundaries are: 

 To the north: the departments Zonda, and Rawson Pocito 
 To the south: the Province of Mendoza 
 To the east: the department May 25
 To the west: with the department Calingasta 

Relief 

The department Sarmiento has a mountainous relief to the west, which belongs to the formation of the foothills, piedmont, formed by sediment that give rise to the river of the arrow and a plain spill east, at the San Juan River area Valley Tulum. Riegan area of the river water, the dry river, the San Juan River, the stream of marshes and artificially concrete channels

Economy 

Sarmiento has an area of 9,192 hectares devoted to agriculture, which highlights, vine crops, 
olives, vegetables such as garlic, onions and tomatoes, cereals and fodder crops, forest and fruit how melon and watermelon, the latter two are products Recognized throughout the province for its quality and quantity. The department Sarmiento was positively received by the Agricultural Promotion Act passed in the province, thanks to today there are plantations with table grapes, grape fine, raisins, wine, fruit carozo, nuggets of fruit, dried fruit, etc.. 

From the point of view ore in mining department there, mainly limestone and its derivatives in the industry (Cal). It is the activity that characterizes western Sarmiento, more specifically the town of Los Berros. In the case of industry, dominated by the winemaking industry, with many wineries and as far north as the department locates a factory called "Loads Minerals San Juan, where the raw materials for making paint 

Departments of San Juan Province, Argentina